Olde Columbine High School is an alternative high school in Longmont, Colorado, United States.

The school is relatively small, having a student body of 80-100 students.

References

External links 

Public high schools in Colorado
Longmont, Colorado
Schools in Boulder County, Colorado